Aquabacterium hongkongensis is a bacterium of the genus Aquabacterium, in the family Comamonadaceae.

References

Comamonadaceae
Bacteria described in 2009